The 1925 Louisville Cardinals football team was an American football team  that represented the University of Louisville as an independent during the 1925 college football season. In its first season under head coach Tom King, the team compiled a perfect 8–0 record and shut out seven of eight opponents.  The only points scored against the team were two points on a safety versus Marshall. The team played its home games at Parkway Field (three games) and Maxwell Field (one game) in Louisville, Kentucky.

Schedule

References

Louisville
Louisville Cardinals football seasons
College football undefeated seasons
Louisville Cardinals football